Las Heras is a city in the province of Mendoza, Argentina, located in the north of the metropolitan area of the provincial capital (Greater Mendoza).

The city is immediately next to Mendoza City, going north down San Martín Avenue. The area includes the low mountain range of El Challao, home to hot springs.

The name of the city is an homage to General Juan Gregorio de las Heras, hero of the Argentine War of Independence.

References
 
 Municipality of Las Heras — Official website.

Populated places in Mendoza Province